The Perth Town Hall, situated on the corner of Hay and Barrack streets in Perth, Western Australia, is the only town hall built by convicts in Australia. Upon completion it was the tallest structure in Perth.

History

Designed by Richard Roach Jewell and James Manning in the Victorian Free Gothic style, the hall was built by convicts and free men between 1867 and 1870.  Its decorations contain a number of convict motifs, including windows in the shape of the broad arrow, and decorations in the shape of a hangman's rope.

The foundation stone for Perth Town Hall was laid on 24 May 1867 by Governor Hampton in a ceremony involving a lot of pomp and parade.  However, there were torrential downpours.  The ceremony went on anyway with an official procession from Government House and  a mock battle performed by the Volunteer Regiments, Enrolled Forces of Pensioners, and the WA Country Regiment.

In the 1929 centenary of Western Australia one of the events in the city of Perth was the placing of a commemorative plaque in the northwest corner of the building by the Governor Sir William Campion.

For many decades in the 20th century, shops were built into the sides of the ground floor, and the public lavatories accessible from Barrack Street were the only ones available for some distance.  The shops included a pharmacy, bank, lunch bar and other shops.  All these businesses and the attendant structures were removed prior to the renovation of the hall.

At the time of its centenary in 1970, the ground floor was still full of commercial businesses.

The Town Hall was restored in the late 1990s at the base in an award-winning restoration to repair the interior of the hall and the gothic arches at its base, which were "modernised" in the middle of the 20th century.

References

External links

 Town Hall fact page, City of Perth
 Pre-1910 photo showing original arches
  (including 1980s photo showing 20th century alterations)

Town halls in Western Australia
Buildings and structures built by convicts in Western Australia
State Register of Heritage Places in the City of Perth
Landmarks in Perth, Western Australia
Gothic Revival architecture in Perth, Western Australia
Victorian architecture in Western Australia
Government buildings completed in 1870
Cultural infrastructure completed in 1870
Cathedral Square, Perth
City of Perth
1870 establishments in Australia
Clock towers in Australia